Elysius flavoabdominalis is a moth of the family Erebidae. It was described by Walter Rothschild in 1935. It is found in São Paulo, Brazil.

References

flavoabdominalis
Moths described in 1935
Moths of South America